Ethylene episulfoxide is the organosulfur compound with the formula C2H4SO.  A colorless liquid, it is one of the simplest sulfoxides.  Because it is a strained ring, ethylene sulfoxide is a highly reactive molecule, decomposing thermally to sulfur monoxide and ethylene.  It is prepared by oxidation of ethylene sulfide with periodate.

References

Episulfides
Sulfoxides